G13  may refer to:
 G-13 (cannabis), a type of cannabis
 County Route G13 (California)
 G13 Baobab Alliance, a political alliance in Benin
 G13 carbine, a proposed Georgian firearm
 Gate 13, a group of supporters of the Greek football club Panathinaikos
 , a Royal Navy G-class submarine
 Logitech G13, a computer keyboard
 Suzuki G13, an automobile engine
 G-13, a Swiss postwar version of the Jagdpanzer 38 Hetzer tank destroyer
 G13, a type of bi-pin lamp base